The savanna gerbil (Gerbilliscus validus) is a species of rodent found in Angola, Burundi, Democratic Republic of the Congo, Ethiopia, Kenya, Mali, Rwanda, Sudan, Tanzania, Uganda, Zambia, and Zimbabwe. Its natural habitats are dry savanna, moist savanna, and arable land.

References

Musser, G. G. and M. D. Carleton. 2005. Superfamily Muroidea. pp. 894–1531 in Mammal Species of the World a Taxonomic and Geographic Reference. D. E. Wilson and D. M. Reeder eds. Johns Hopkins University Press, Baltimore.

Gerbilliscus
Mammals described in 1890
Taxonomy articles created by Polbot